While There's Life is a 1913 American silent short drama film starring Charlotte Burton, Jean Durrell, George Field, Robert Grey, and Billie West.

External links

1913 films
1913 drama films
Silent American drama films
American silent short films
American black-and-white films
1913 short films
1910s American films
1910s English-language films
American drama short films